Nana Ama Browne Klutse was born on 23 May 1981 at Nyanfeku Ekroful. She had her primary education at the Anomabo Methodist Primary and JHS.

She continued to Mfantsiman Girls Secondary school and later went to University of Cape Coast in Ghana to read BSc Physics. She pursued her PhD Climatology at University of Cape Town in South Africa.

Scientific career 

Dr Klutse studies climate dynamics of West Africa. Her work focuses on climate science and development specifically on the African monsoon. She is a senior lecturer at the Department of Physics, University of Ghana. In the past, she managed the Remote Sensing and Climate Centre. Klutse is a Climate Science Fellow of the African Institute for Mathematical Sciences and a lead author contributing to the IPCC Sixth Assessment Report (AR6). She also actively encourages girls in Ghana to consider science careers and supports improvements in science education in the country.

Klutse worked at the Ghana Space Science and Technology Institute of the Ghana Atomic Energy Commission as a senior research scientist from 2016 to 2018. Prior to this, she had been a guest lecturer at the West African Science Service Centre on Climate and Adapted Land Use (WASCAL) in Akure, Nigeria.

Political career

Klutse is also active in politics as a member of the National Democratic Congress.

References 

Climatologists
Women climatologists
Living people
Place of birth missing (living people)
Nationality missing
Women atmospheric scientists
Academic staff of the University of Ghana
1981 births